The Los Angeles County Metropolitan Transportation Authority (LACMTA), branded as Metro, is the state agency that plans, operates, and coordinates funding for most of the transportation system in Los Angeles County, California. The agency directly operates a large transit system that includes bus, light rail, heavy rail (subway), and bus rapid transit services; and provides funding for transit it does not operate, including Metrolink commuter rail, municipal bus operators and paratransit services. Metro also provides funding and directs planning for railroad and highway projects within Los Angeles County. It is the single largest transit agency within the county as well.

Background 

The Los Angeles County Metropolitan Transportation Authority was formed on February 1, 1993, from the merger of two rival agencies: the Southern California Rapid Transit District (SCRTD or more often, RTD) and the Los Angeles County Transportation Commission (LACTC).

The RTD was founded on August 18, 1964, to operate most public transportation in the urbanized Southern California region, including Los Angeles, San Bernardino, Orange, and Riverside counties. RTD replaced the major predecessor public agency, the Los Angeles Metropolitan Transit Authority, and took over eleven failing other bus companies and services in the Southern California region. Services outside of Los Angeles County began to be divested in the early 1980s.

The LACTC began operation in 1977 after a state requirement that all counties form local transportation commissions. Its main objective was to be the guardian of all transportation funding, both transit and highway, for Los Angeles County.

The bickering between the two agencies came to a head in the 1980s. At that time, the LACTC was building the Blue Line (now A Line) light rail line between Los Angeles and Long Beach, while the RTD was building the Red Line (now B Line) subway in Downtown Los Angeles. It was revealed that due to disputes between the agencies, the LACTC was planning to end the Blue Line at Pico Station, instead of serving the 7th Street/Metro Center station being built by the RTD six blocks north.

LA Metro has assumed the functions of both agencies and now develops and oversees transportation plans, policies, funding programs, and both short-term and long-range solutions to mobility, accessibility and environmental needs in the county. The agency is also the primary transit provider for the city of Los Angeles, providing the bulk of such services even though the city's Los Angeles Department of Transportation (LADOT) operates a smaller system of its own within the MTA service area in the city of Los Angeles.

The agency is based out of the Metro Headquarters Building, a 26-story high-rise office tower located next to Union Station, a major transportation hub and the main train station for the Los Angeles metropolitan area.

The Los Angeles County Metropolitan Transportation Authority operates the third-largest public transportation system in the United States by ridership with a 1,433 mi2 (3,711 km2) operating area and 2,000 peak hour buses on the street any given business day. Metro also operates  of urban rail service. The authority has 9,892 employees, making it one of the region's largest employers.

The authority also partially funds sixteen municipal bus operators and an array of transportation projects including bikeways and pedestrian facilities, local roads and highway improvements, goods movement, Metrolink regional commuter rail, Freeway Service Patrol and freeway call boxes within the County of Los Angeles.

To increase sustainability in transportation services, Metro also provides bike and pedestrian improvements for the over 10.1 million residents of Los Angeles County.

Security and law enforcement services on Metro property (including buses and trains) are currently provided by the Los Angeles County Sheriff's Department's Transit Services Bureau via contract, in conjunction with Metro Transit Enforcement Department, Los Angeles Police Department (Union Station and all LACMTA rail services within the City of Los Angeles)in the City of Long Beach, the Long Beach Police Department and in the City of Santa Monica, (California)|the Santa Monica Police Department.

Services

Metro Rail 

Metro Rail is a rail mass transit system with two subway and five light rail lines.

 is a light rail line running between Downtown Los Angeles and Downtown Long Beach.

 is a subway line running between Downtown Los Angeles and North Hollywood.

 is a light rail line running between Redondo Beach and Norwalk, largely in the median of the 105 Freeway. It provides indirect access to Los Angeles International Airport via a shuttle bus.

 is a subway line running between Downtown Los Angeles and the Mid-Wilshire district of Los Angeles. Most of its route is shared with the B Line. The line is currently being extended westward.

 is a light rail line running between Downtown Los Angeles and Santa Monica.

 is a light rail line running between South Los Angeles and Inglewood, with a connection to the C Line opening in late 2023 and a connection to the to LAX Automated People Mover opening in 2024.

 is a light rail line running between East Los Angeles and Azusa via Downtown Los Angeles. The L Line will be discontinued in 2023 when the A and E Lines take over the L Line's route after the completion of the Regional Connector.

Metro Bus 

Metro is the primary bus operator in the Los Angeles Basin, the San Fernando Valley, and the western San Gabriel Valley. Other transit providers operate more frequent service in the rest of the county. Regions in Los Angeles County that Metro Bus does not serve at all include rural regions, the Pomona Valley, the Santa Clarita Valley, and the Antelope Valley.

In addition to hundreds of traditional routes, Metro also operates a handful of Rapid routes that offer limited-stop services heavily traveled arterial streets and Express routes that travel on the extensive Southern California freeway system.

Metro Busway 

Metro Busway is a bus rapid transit system with two lines operating on dedicated or shared-use busways.

The Metro Busway system is meant to mimic the Metro Rail system, both in the vehicle's design and in the operation of the line. Vehicles stop at dedicated stations (except for the portion of the Metro J Line in Downtown Los Angeles), vehicles receive priority at intersections and are painted in a silver livery similar to Metro Rail vehicles.

 is a bus rapid transit line running between North Hollywood and Chatsworth.

 is a bus rapid transit line running between El Monte, Downtown Los Angeles, and Harbor Gateway, with some buses also serving San Pedro.

Busways 
The Metro Busway J Line operates over two busways, semi-exclusive roadways built into the Southern California freeway system. These busways are also used by other bus routes to speed up their trips.
 El Monte Busway is a combination busway and high-occupancy toll (HOT) roadway that runs in the median of the San Bernardino Freeway (I-10) and on a separate right-of-way. The busway provides express bus service between Downtown LA and the San Gabriel Valley. Services on the busway are operated by both Metro and Foothill Transit.
 Harbor Transitway is a combination busway and HOT roadway that runs in the median of the Harbor Freeway (I-110). The busway provides express bus service between San Pedro and Downtown LA. Services on the busway are operated by Metro, GTrans, LADOT, OC Bus and Torrance Transit.

Other services 
 Metro Bike Share: A bikeshare program in Downtown LA, Central LA, Hollywood, North Hollywood and on the Westside.
 Metro ExpressLanes: High-occupancy toll lanes on the El Monte Busway and Harbor Transitway.
 Metro Freeway Service Patrol: A joint effort between Metro, Caltrans, and the California Highway Patrol offering free quick-fix repairs and towing from freeways.
 Metro Micro: An on-demand transit service, operated using vans in 8 zones around the region.
 Bike paths:  of bike facilities for commuter and recreational purposes.
 HOV (Carpool) Lanes: ,  both directions/each lane, of carpool, vanpool, and express bus lanes.
Metrolink: Partially funded by Metro, it is Southern California's regional commuter rail system.

Fares 
All Metro passes are sold on TAP Cards, smart fare cards on which customers can load value or a pass; they are valid on all Metro buses and trains as well as most city buses.

Fare gates are installed at all B, C, D and K Line stations, along with select A, E and L Line stations. Fare gates were added after 2007 to reduce fare evasion. At the time the decision was criticized for its cost and perceived ineffectiveness.

Ridership 

The Metro B Line has the highest ridership of all Metro Rail lines and also the lowest operational cost because of its high ridership. The Metro Liner Metro J Line has the lowest ridership of all color-branded lines. Average daily boardings and passenger miles for all of 2018 are as follows:

Governance 
Metro is governed by a board of directors with 14 members, 13 of whom are voting members. The Board is composed of:
 The five Los Angeles County Supervisors
 The mayor of Los Angeles
 Three Los Angeles mayor-appointees (at least one of whom must be an L.A. City Council member)
 Four city council members or mayors from cities other than Los Angeles, who each represent one region: San Gabriel/Pomona Valley, Arroyo/Verdugo, Gateway Cities and Westside Cities
 One non-voting member appointed by the Governor of California (traditionally the Director of Caltrans District 7)

While the Metro board makes decisions on large issues, they rely on Service Councils to advise on smaller decisions, such as on bus stop placement and over bus service changes. To enable this work, the councils call and conduct public hearings, evaluate Metro programs in their area, and meet with management staff. There are five Service Councils, each representing a different region: Gateway Cities, San Fernando Valley, San Gabriel Valley, South Bay, and Westside/Central. Each council is led by a board composed of a political appointees.

Chair 

Ara Najarian

Vice Chair 

Jacquelyn Dupont-Walker

Chair Pro Tem

Janice Hahn

Chief Executive Officer

Stephanie Wiggins

Funding 
A complex mix of federal, state, county and city tax dollars as well as bonds and fare box revenue funds Metro.

The Metro budget for 2020 is $7.2 billion. Below is the funding breakdown from Metro's fiscal year 2020 budget:

Jurisdiction 
The agency is a public transportation and planning agency that lies under the jurisdiction of the State of California. Although it falls under State regulations, it can also partake in regional and municipal levels of rule during a transportation development project. For example, it can play a role in policies regarding a state's housing policies, since the living situation of one affects the methods of transportation its residents will take.

This transit agency can measure successful projects through key pointers such as low income ridership increase and an increase of favorable environmental and health factors for its public community. Increased low income ridership is a significant factor because that focus group tends to makes up the majority of public transit ridership. Favorable environmental and health factors are also relevant factors because they indicate a positive relationship within the space developed and its residents.

Fleet 

Most of Metro's bus fleet is powered by compressed natural gas (CNG), the largest such fleet in the United States. Using CNG reduces emissions of particulates by 90%, carbon monoxide by 80%, and greenhouse gases by 20% compared to diesel powered buses. The agency is also operating a limited number of battery electric buses, notably on the G Line busway, with plans to convert into a fully electric bus system Buses feature on-board visual displays and automatic voice announcement systems that announce the next stop.

The Metro Rail fleet is broken down into two main types: light rail vehicles and rapid transit cars (commonly called subway cars in Los Angeles). Metro's light rail vehicles, used on the A, C, E, K and L Lines, are  articulated, high-floor double-ended cars, powered by overhead catenary lines, which typically run in two or three car consists. Metro's subway cars, used on the B and D Lines, are  electric multiple unit, married-pair cars, powered by electrified third rail, that typically run in four or six car consists.

Future

NextGen Bus Plan 
Metro is currently implementing its "NextGen Bus Plan," a major restructuring of the agencies routes. The plan eliminates most of the Metro Rapid routes, along with low-performing Metro Local lines, to invest in the remaining routes. Metro says the plan will double the number of frequent bus lines (defined as a bus every 10 minute or better) and expand midday, evening and weekend service, while ensuring that 99% of current riders continue to have a less than -mile walk to their bus stop.

Regional Connector 

The Regional Connector is a tunnel under Downtown Los Angeles, joining the L Line at Little Tokyo Station (1st Street and Central Avenue) to the A Line and E Line at 7th Street/Metro Center. 2 stations will the introduced in this matter, with those stations being "Grand Av Arts/Bunker Hill" and "Historic Broadway". This will lead to the creation of two lines, one between Long Beach and Azusa, and the other between East Los Angeles and Santa Monica. The project is expected to open in early 2023.

D Line Extension 

Phase 1 of the D Line Extension will add three new subway stations to the D Line at Wilshire/La Brea, Wilshire/Fairfax, and Wilshire/La Cienega. Construction on Phase 1 began in 2014 and is expected to be complete in 2024. Phase 2 to Century City is expected to be completed in 2025, followed by Phase 3 to Westwood in 2027.

Foothill Extension 

Metro is planning an extension of the L Line (will be part of the A Line upon the Regional Connector’s completion in 2023) into the San Gabriel Valley to Pomona–North station. The first phase of this extension, to Azusa, opened on March 5, 2016. Groundbreaking for the second phase to Pomona occurred on December 2, 2017, with construction starting in July 2020. The project is expected to be complete by early 2025.

Aerial Rapid Transit 
Metro, in partnership with LA Aerial Rapid Transit Technologies LLC, is currently proposing to construct an aerial gondola system to connect Dodger Stadium and the stadium's surrounding communities to Union Station in Downtown Los Angeles. When completed, the approximate 5,000 people per hour, per direction aerial gondola is expected to transport visitors from Union Station to Dodger Stadium in approximately seven minutes. Additionally, the proposed project would also include several improvements to the nearby Los Angeles State Historic Park.

Long-range Measure M plans 
Measure M, passed in November 2016, extends and increases the Measure R 30-year half-cent sales tax to a permanent one-cent sales tax. This tax is expected to fund $120 billion in highway and transit projects over 40 years. The tax is also expected to support over 778,000 jobs in the Los Angeles area and $79.3 billion in economic output.

Projects to be funded by Measure M, not previously mentioned above, include:
 A streetcar in Downtown Los Angeles
 The Los Angeles County portion of the High Desert Corridor: a freeway, rail transit, and bikeway corridor linking cities in the Antelope and Victor Valleys.  Caltrans put the freeway on hold in 2019.
 Bus Rapid Transit connecting the G and B Lines in North Hollywood with the L Line in Pasadena
 Conversion of the G Line from Bus Rapid Transit to Light Rail
 Light Rail along Van Nuys Boulevard to San Fernando (East San Fernando Light Rail Transit Project)
 Light Rail along the West Santa Ana Branch from Union Station to Artesia
 Bus Rapid Transit along Vermont Avenue between the B Line at Hollywood Blvd. and the C Line at 120th St.
 Southern extension of the C Line to Torrance Transit Center
 Eastern extension of the C Line to the Norwalk/Santa Fe Springs Metrolink station
 Heavy Rail tunnel underneath or monorail over the Sepulveda Pass linking the G Line in the San Fernando Valley and the D Line at Westwood/UCLA
 Heavy Rail or Monorail extension from the D line at Westwood/UCLA to LAX
 Extension of the L Line from East Los Angeles with a branch to Whittier next to the San Gabriel River
 Bus Rapid Transit from LAX to the E Line at Santa Monica along Lincoln Blvd.
 Bus Rapid Transit in the North San Fernando Valley

See also 

 Transportation in Los Angeles
 List of Los Angeles Metro Rail stations
 List of Los Angeles Metro Busway stations
 List of former Metro Express routes

People
 Hal Bernson, former Authority chairman

References

External links 

 Los Angeles County Metropolitan Transportation Authority

 
Government agencies established in 1993
1993 establishments in California
County government agencies in California
Bus transportation in California
Passenger rail transportation in California
Intermodal transportation authorities in California
 
 
 
Transit authorities with natural gas buses
Transportation in Los Angeles
Transportation in the San Fernando Valley